Adamson Landing Field is a closed airport located 1.8 mi south-southeast of Olancha, California.

History 
During World War II, the airport was used by the United States Army Air Forces as an auxiliary training airfield for the flying school at Lone Pine Airport, California.

The facility closed sometime after the war.    The remains of the runways and ground facilities can be seen in aerial imagery.

See also

 California World War II Army Airfields

References 

Airports in Inyo County, California